Andrew, Andy, or Drew Smith may refer to:

Government and military
Andrew Smith (British politician) (born 1951), English Labour Party politician
Andrew Smith (Canadian politician), member of the Legislative Assembly of Manitoba
Andrew Smith (military officer), Royal Canadian Navy officer
Andrew Smith (officer), Jamaican Maroon officer
Andrew Jackson Smith (1815–1897), American Civil War army general
Andrew Jackson Smith (Medal of Honor) (1843–1932), American Civil War soldier
Andrew Juxon-Smith (1931–1996), politician and military official in Sierra Leone
Drew Smith (politician), Scottish politician

Sports

Cricket
Andrew Smith (cricketer, born 1969), English cricketer
Andrew Smith (Australian cricketer) (1889–1983), cricketer for South Australia
Andrew Michael Smith (born 1967), English cricketer

Football (soccer)
Andrew Smith (footballer, born 1879) (1879–1960), Scottish footballer with West Bromwich Albion and Bristol Rovers, among other clubs
Andrew Smith (footballer, born 1989), English footballer with Accrington Stanley
Andy Smith (footballer, born 1890) (1890–1968), English footballer
Andy Smith (footballer, born 1968), Scottish footballer (Airdrie, Dunfermline)
Andy Smith (footballer, born 1980), Northern Ireland international footballer
Andy Smith (footballer, born 2001), English footballer

Rugby
Andrew Smith (rugby union, born 1985), Australian rugby union player
Andrew Smith (rugby union, born 2000), Irish rugby union player
Andy Smith (rugby league) (born 1984), English rugby league player

Other sports
Andrew Smith (badminton) (born 1984), English badminton player
Andrew Smith (basketball, born 1990) (1990–2016), American basketball player
Andrew Smith (basketball, born 1992), American-Latvian basketball player
Andrew Smith (Canadian runner) (born 1979), Canadian runner and World Championships competitor
Andrew Smith (canoeist), British slalom canoeist
Andrew Smith (field hockey) (born 1978), Australian field hockey player
Andrew Smith (Australian footballer) (born 1960), Australian rules footballer
Andrew Smith (sprinter) (born 1964), Jamaican sprinter
Andrew W. Smith (1886–1959), American football player and coach, college athletics administrator, US Army officer, and physician
Andrew Smith (golfer) (1849–1901), Canadian amateur golfer
Andy Smith (American football) (1883–1926), American college football coach
Andy Smith (darts player) (born 1967), darts player who competes in Professional Darts Corporation events
Andy Smith (hurler) (born 1983), Irish hurler
Andy Smith (speedway rider) (born 1966), former Speedway Grand Prix rider
Drew Smith (baseball), baseball player

Literature and journalism
Andrew Smith (author) (born 1961), American-born British journalist and non-fiction writer
Andrew Smith (British writer) (born 1962), British screenwriter, playwright and author
Andrew Smith (columnist) (born 1958), American columnist and editor, best known as "Captain Comics"
Andrew A. Smith (born 1959), American young adult fiction writer
Andrew Phillip Smith (born 1966), Welsh writer
Andy Smith (entrepreneur) (born 1968), American author and entrepreneur
Drew Nellins Smith, American writer

Other fields
Andrew Smith (bishop) (born 1944), suffragan bishop of the Episcopal Diocese of Connecticut
Andrew Smith (composer) (born 1970), British-Norwegian classical conductor, organist and composer
Andrew Smith (judge) (born 1947), judge of the High Court of England and Wales
Andrew Smith (zoologist) (1797–1872), Scottish zoologist
Andrew Smith (1836–1894), one of the Smith Brothers who were makers of cough drops
Andrew Smith Hallidie (1836–1900), American rail transport designer and promoter, born as Andrew Smith
Andrew Hayden-Smith (born 1983), English actor, presenter; formerly known as Andrew Smith
Andrew Hugh Smith (1931–2012), British businessman
Andrew Lawrenceson Smith (1620–1694), Scottish painter
Andrew Reynolds Smith (born 1966), British businessman
Andrew Smyth (engineer) (born 1991), British engineer and baker
Greedy Smith (Andrew McArthur Smith, 1956–2019), Australian singer for Mental As Anything

See also 
Andre Smith (disambiguation)